Sam & Kate is a 2022 American comedy film written and directed by Darren Le Gallo, and starring Dustin Hoffman, Sissy Spacek, Jake Hoffman and Schuyler Fisk. It is Le Gallo's feature directorial debut, and his wife Amy Adams served as an executive producer.

Cast
 Dustin Hoffman as Bill
 Sissy Spacek as Tina
 Jake Hoffman as Sam
 Schuyler Fisk as Kate
 Henry Thomas
 Elizabeth Becka

Plot summary
Sam, a regular worker at a chocolate factory meets Kate, who owns a bookstore. He is intrigued; however, she rebuffs his advances by insisting she is not dating. Sam is a gifted artist and lives with Bill, his father. Kate is close with her mother, Tina, who lives on her own and suffers from Diogenes’ syndrome (in Kate’s words,  “she is a hoarder”). Kate can’t stand looking at pictures her mother has just found and leaves sobbing. Bill has health problems and smokes, drinks and eats red meat against the advice of his doctor. Kate accepts a coffee with Sam, which they both enjoy, and after a few get-togethers which involve family and friends, they kiss, and spend the night together after skating on New Year’s Eve. Bill goes on a date with Tina, after which they return to her house, where he sees the chaos of her hoarding and leaves abruptly, later calling the authorities to alert them. Kate is notified and must once again empty her mother’s house.

Sam and others help, and in the house Sam finds pictures of Kate with a baby boy and another man. He mistakingly gives away a box of items that Kate had intended to keep, chiefly mementos of her son. She confesses to Sam that her family had died in a car accident. The subsequent awkwardness keeps the two apart, though Sam is able to return to Kate one toy that had belonged to her son.

One day, Sam comes back home to find his father dead in front of the TV. After a few days, he goes to Kate’s house to tell her that he has learned so much from his father going through his things, which he should’ve known from him when he was alive. He confesses he would hate for her not to know how much she means to him and they fall into a warm embrace and kiss.

Production
Filming began in Thomasville, Georgia, in February 2022.  In April 2022, it was announced that filming wrapped.

Release
In September 2022, it was announced that Vertical Entertainment acquired North American and UK/Ireland distribution rights to the film, which was released on November 11, 2022.

The film also premiered at the Austin Film Festival.

Reception
The film has a 73% rating on Rotten Tomatoes based on 30 reviews.

References

External links
 

2022 comedy films
American comedy films
Fictional duos
Films shot in Georgia (U.S. state)